Wyman H. Packard (1911-2002) was a United States Navy captain and historian, best known for his book A Century of U.S. Naval Intelligence.

Background
Wyman Howard Packard was born on December 13, 1911, in Brockton, Massachusetts.

Career
Packard served in the US Navy from 1931 to 1965 and reach the rank of captain.  Duty stations included:  USS Hornet (CV-8), Assistant Operations Offier COMSOTAC, Assistant (and Deputy) Director in the Office of Naval Intelligence, COF Staff (Intel) CINCPACFLT, and Assistant Naval Attache in London.

Personal life and death
Packard married Ruth Wordell; they had two children, and he adopted her other two children.

Wyman H. Packard died on September 12, 2002, in McLean, Virginia, and was buried at Arlington National Cemetery.

Legacy
Aside from his service, Packard's book A Century of U.S. Naval Intelligence is a quiet, steady source for military historians.

Awards
 Legion of Merit (1966)
 Purple Heart
 Bronze Star Medal
 Asiatic-Pacific Campaign Medal (4 Stars)
 World War II Victory Medal

Works

Books
 A Century of U.S. Naval Intelligence (1994)

Articles
 "Notes on the Early History of Naval Intelligence in the United States," ONI Review (1957)
 "The Naval Attaché," U.S. Naval Institute Proceedings (1965)
 "Intelligence and the Navy," Naval Review (1968)
 "The History of ONI," Naval Intelligence Professionals Quarterly (4 parts 1987-1988)
 "The Origins of Naval Intelligence Professionals," Naval Intelligence Professionals Quarterly (1989)

References

External links
 Papers of Wyman Packard (US Naval Historical Center)
 A century of U.S. naval intelligence / Wyman H. Packard (Smithsonian)
 Modern Biographical Files in the Navy Department Library (Naval History and Heritage Command)

1911 births
2002 deaths
20th-century American naval officers
United States Army personnel of World War II